N. Prabhakar is an Indian scientist and the Chief Controller, System Analysis and Modelling Centre (SAM-C) of the Defence Research and Development Organization (DRDO). He graduated in Electrical and Electronics Engineering (BE) from Annamalai University and enrolled at the Indian Institute of Science, Bengaluru from where he obtained his master's degree (ME). He pursued his research at Shanmugha Arts, Science, Technology & Research Academy, secured a doctoral degree in Air Defence Systems and joined the Defence Research and Development Laboratory (DRDL) in 1980.

Prabhakar worked at DRDO in various capacities including Project Director AD (Mission), Program Director (ASTRA) and Associate Director of Defence Research and Development Laboratory (DRDL). He is known to have contributed to the development of Trajectory Optimization for Prithvi, AD Weapon System Design and Optimal Guidance Algorithms for Ballistic Missile Intercept Missions besides preparing the feasibility report for all Indian tactical missile programmes.

A Fellow of the Institution of Engineers (India), the Operational Research Society (UK) and the Aeronautical Society of India, Prabhakar is a recipient of three DRDO awards such as DRDO Scientist of the year Award in 2001, the Path Breaking Technology Award in 2007 and Performance Excellence Award in 2009 as well as the ASI Award from the Astronautical Society of India in 2009. The Government of India honoured him in 2015, with the award of Padma Shri, the fourth highest Indian civilian award for his contributions to Indian missile programme.

See also

 Institution of Engineers (India)
 Operational Research Society
 Aeronautical Society of India
 Defence Research and Development Organization
 Defence Research and Development Laboratory
 Annamalai University
 Indian Institute of Science
 Shanmugha Arts, Science, Technology & Research Academy

References

Recipients of the Padma Shri in science & engineering
Scientists from Tamil Nadu
Defence Research and Development Organisation
Annamalai University alumni
Indian Institute of Science alumni
Indian military engineers
20th-century Indian engineers
1954 births
2015 deaths